Otto Eugene Adams (Sr.) (November 1, 1889 – January 31, 1968), the architect, was born in Baltimore, Maryland, on November 1, 1889, to a family with Baltimore and German ancestry.

Family
Adams's  father, Henry Adams, was an emigrant from Duisburg, Prussia, and a successful engineer who enjoyed considerable professional prominence due to his work with the District of Columbia government buildings, and his pioneering and organization of the ASHVE. At the time of Otto's birth, Mr. Adams was achieving prominence as building system designer due to his work on the Corcoran and Flagg buildings in Washington, D.C. Despite his father's involvement in D.C. building, the Adams family remained in Baltimore throughout Otto's childhood. His mother was Mary Elizabeth Klingelhofer, whose parents, John E. and Mary Klingelhofer, were Baltimore bakers who had emigrated from Hessen, Germany. Adams was the middle child of the children who are known: his brother Ernest Henry Adams was the oldest, Clarence Timothy Adams the younger brother. Both of his brothers followed their father directly into the family business as engineers and became officers when the company was incorporated, upon their father's death.

Adams married Mrs. Marie Hagerty Adams, with whom he had two sons: Otto Eugene Adams Jr. and Henry J. Adams (the geologist and financier).

Education

At age 17, Adams left Baltimore to attend college at University of Pennsylvania where he studied Architecture, completing both a B.S. (1911) and M.S. (1912) degrees.  During his time at Penn, one of his colleagues, James Richard Edmunds Jr., was also to become a notable Baltimore architect. Adams's talent was recognized early, when his participation in the New York Intercollegiate Architectural Federation competition gained him a mention while still an undergraduate.  Otto Eugene Adams served during World War I as a captain in the US Army in France where he was injured in the arm. Thereafter he expanded his expertise and theoretical understanding of his field through advanced certification at both the prestigious Ecole des Beaux Arts, Paris and at the American Academy, Rome.  O. E. Adams was listed in the Maryland Manual editions 1916 through 1920 as a Notary Public and his address was given as 900 N. Gay St.

Practice

Much of the work attributed to Adams was creation of public architecture or bent toward theoretical study of buildings: programming, rejuvenation and improving the efficiency of pre-existing facilities. In his report to the mayor's office, regarding the state of the Baltimore City Courthouse, he said: "it has been doing the work for which it was designed. Fortunately, due to having a fundamentally sound building to work on, it is possible to so modernize the Courthouse for another generation."  The approach to his work and quotations that he gave about his work, demonstrate an interest in sustainable design, embodied energy in building assemblies, and overall efficiency, much the way current designers are interested in green architecture.

Adams had a long career, considering his formal retirement in 1959, of over 40 years. Throughout that time he collaborated on much of his work with his father's engineering consulting firm. Adams was a partner in the firm of Adams & Rigg for much of that time. Though the arrangement may have only been formalized later, since as late as 1946, he is given recognition as if a sole-proprietor. Adams was a member of the American Institute of Architects and was faculty for the Maryland Institute, College of Art architectural program.

Works

Public works
An incomplete list of works and studies attributed to Otto Eugene Adams, in Baltimore and other Maryland cities:

 Baltimore City Courthouse study
 Dormitory Building, Baltimore Orphanage (address not given)
 Emanuel Evangelical Church, Baltimore & Garrison Ave., Baltimore
 Methodist Home for the Aged  which is currently Springwell Senior Living Community
 Home purchased for Baltimore Orphanage Asylum at Govans "Marble Hall" Woodbourne Ave. home of Charles S. Abell originally summer home of Enoch Pratt. Asylum to move from Stricker St.,
 Nursery and Childs Hospital - Woodbourne Rd. and East side York Rd.
 Competition for the Baltimore City College building
 Kelso Home for Orphans (became Kelso Home for Girls) - building and planning,  tract, Towson (charity now resides at Garrison Ave. and Forest Park Ave. ),  (now Towson YMCA).
 Enoch Pratt Free Library Branch no. 27 Westport, 1929.
 Fairfield Elementary School (Chesapeake Ave and Sun Street), 1942
 Govans School no. 213, York Rd. 1951
 Baker Memorial Chapel abt.1958 and possibly other buildings at Western Maryland College (now McDaniel College). The campus plan and several buildings look as if they might have been fashioned by him.
 Woodbourne Junior High (now Chinquapin School # 46 at Woodbourne and Beauregard avenues) completed 1959
 Baltimore (Broadway) Public Comfort Station 1922
 Baltimore Police (Belair Road) Sub-station 1922

Residential designs and alterations
An incomplete list:

Guilford (neighborhood)
 211 Chancery Rd. of Roland Pk. 1928 
 214 Chancery Rd. of Roland Pk. 1925
 219 Southway 1920

Roland Park (neighborhood) Civic League
 107 Club Rd. 1926, 1928 
 509 Edgevale Rd. 1925, 1948 
 3 Englewood Rd. 1929 
 5403 Falls Rd. 1936 
 903 Falls Rd. 1933 
 312 Overhill Rd. 1929 
 16 Overhill Rd. 1928 
 4906 Roland Ave. 1932 
 428 Roland Ave. 1926

Homeland (neighborhood)
 202 Churchwarden's Rd. 1929

External links
 Baltimore Architecture Foundation
 Baltimore Dead Architects Society
 Biography of James Bosley Noel Wyatt
 Council of Independent Colleges, Historic Campus Architecture Project - Baker Memorial Chapel

References

1889 births
1968 deaths
20th-century American architects
American people of German descent
Architects from Baltimore